The 1979 AIAW National Small College Basketball Championship was the fifth annual tournament hosted by the Association for Intercollegiate Athletics for Women to determine the national champion of collegiate basketball among its small college members in the United States.

The tournament was held at North Dakota State University in Fargo, North Dakota between March 20–24, 1979.

South Carolina State defeated Dayton in the championship game, 73–68, to capture the Lady Bulldogs' first AIAW small college national title. 

Sixteen teams participated in a single-elimination tournament that additionally included a third-place final for the two teams that lost in the semifinal games.

Tournament bracket

See also
1979 AIAW National Large College Basketball Championship

References

AIAW women's basketball tournament
AIAW Small College
AIAW National Division I Basketball Championship
1979 in sports in North Dakota
Women's sports in North Dakota